The Molony Baronetcy, of the City of Dublin, is a title in the Baronetage of the United Kingdom. It was created on 21 January 1925 for Thomas Molony, the former Lord Chief Justice of Ireland.

Molony baronets, of the City of Dublin (1925)
Sir Thomas Francis Molony, 1st Baronet (1865–1949)
Sir Hugh Francis Molony, 2nd Baronet (1900–1976)
Sir (Thomas) Desmond Molony, 3rd Baronet (1937–2014)
Sir Peter John Molony, 4th Baronet (1937–2019)
Sir John Benjamin Molony, 5th Baronet (born 1966)

The heir apparent to the baronetcy is the current holder's (John Benjamin Molony) son, Joseph Sebastian Molony (born 18 April 2006).

Notes

References
Kidd, Charles, Williamson, David (editors). Debrett's Peerage and Baronetage (1990 edition). New York: St Martin's Press, 1990, 

Molony